Count Hans Robert von Rosen (8 August 1888 – 2 September 1952) was a Swedish Army captain and horse rider who competed in the 1912 Summer Olympics and in the 1920 Summer Olympics.

Career
In 1912 he and his horse Lord Iron were part of the Swedish equestrian team, which won the gold medal in the team jumping.

Eight years later he won the gold medal with the Swedish jumping team again. This time with his horse Poor Boy. He also competed in the individual dressage event and won the bronze medal with his horse Running Sister.

von Rosen became ryttmästare in 1925 and equerry at the Royal Court of Sweden the same year.

Awards and decorations
King Gustaf V's Jubilee Commemorative Medal (1948)
Knight of the Order of Vasa
Second Class of the Military Cross

References

External links 
 profile

1888 births
1973 deaths
Swedish Army officers
Swedish dressage riders
Swedish show jumping riders
Olympic equestrians of Sweden
Swedish male equestrians
Equestrians at the 1912 Summer Olympics
Equestrians at the 1920 Summer Olympics
Olympic gold medalists for Sweden
Olympic bronze medalists for Sweden
Olympic medalists in equestrian
Swedish counts
Knights of the Order of Vasa
Medalists at the 1920 Summer Olympics
Medalists at the 1912 Summer Olympics
People from Norrköping Municipality
Sportspeople from Östergötland County